Ingrid Schmithüsen (born 1960) is a German soprano, specialising in concert music and Lied recitals. She recorded Bach cantatas with Masaaki Suzuki.

References

External links
 Ingrid Schmithüsen konzertbuero-braun.de 
 Ingrid Schmithüsen SMCQ
 Liedduo / Schmithüsen – Palm imzentrumlied.de 
 Ingrid Schmithüsen Philharmonischer Chor Bonn 

Living people
German sopranos
German performers of early music
Women performers of early music
1960 births